Polychelida is an infraorder of decapod crustaceans. Fossil representatives are known dating from as far back as the Upper Triassic. A total of 38 extant species, all in the family Polychelidae, and 55 fossil species have been described.

History
Polychelida had traditionally been included in the infraorder Palinura, alongside the spiny lobsters and slipper lobsters (now in the infraorder Achelata). In 1995, Gerhard Scholtz and Stefan Richter of the  carried out a phylogenetic study of the "Reptantia", and concluded that "Palinura" was paraphyletic. They therefore abandoned that taxon and introduced instead the new clade Polychelida.

Classification
Polychelida belongs to the group Reptantia, which consists of the walking/crawling decapods (lobsters and crabs).  Polychelida is the sister clade to the infraorder Astacidea, which contains the "true" lobsters and crayfish.  The cladogram below shows Polychelida's placement within the larger order Decapoda, from analysis by Wolfe et al., 2019.

The animals grouped into the infraorder Polychelida are united by the presence of at least four pairs of chelae (claws). Five families are included, all but one of which are extinct. The 38 extant species are all in the family Polychelidae. The group has a fossil record stretching back to the Upper Triassic, and had its peak diversity in the Mesozoic. Although the extant species are all restricted to deep waters, the group is thought to have originated in shallow water. Over time, the eyes have reduced in size to the vestigial state seen in extant Polychelidae, the body has narrowed, and the chelae have become less robust; among extant taxa, the most plesiomorphic state is seen in Willemoesia.

References

External links

 
Arthropod infraorders
Extant Late Triassic first appearances